Francis Finch (c. 1602August 1677) of Rushock, Wiltshire, was an English politician who sat in the House of Commons of England from 1661 to 1677.

He was known as a Protestant and supporter of the monarchy and was rewarded during the Restoration. Finch was a Member of Parliament (MP) for Winchelsea in the Cavalier Parliament from 1661 until his death in 1677.

References

English MPs 1661–1679
1600s births
1677 deaths
Year of birth uncertain